Simona Stašová (born 19 March 1955) is a Czech stage, film and television actress. Since making her theatre debut in 1976, she has acted on stage in theatres and appeared in numerous films and television productions. Stašová has won multiple awards for her acting, both inside her native Czech Republic and internationally.

Career
Stašová studied at the Faculty of Theatre in Prague.

Stašová was nominated for an Elsa television award in 2004, for her role in the Česká televize production Místo nahoře. At the 2007 Thalia Awards she won the category of Best Actress in a Play, for her performance of the role of Evy Meara in a production of Neil Simon's The Gingerbread Lady at the Antonín Dvořák Theatre in Příbram. Stašová was named Actress of the Year at the 2014 TýTý Awards. At the 2014 Tiburon Film Festival, Stašová was named winner in the Best Actress category for her role in the 2013 television movie Sebemilenec. She was also awarded for the same role, winning at the Seoul International Drama Awards in 2015.

Personal life
Stašová is the daughter of Czech actress Jiřina Bohdalová and Břetislav Staš, who are divorced. She has been married three times: to Czech actor Pavel Trávníček, Italian professor Eusebio Ciccotti and Czech actor Pavel Skřípal. Stašová has two sons, Marek and Vojta, from her marriages to Ciccotti and Skřípal respectively.

Selected filmography

Films
Incomplete Eclipse (1982)
Jako kníže Rohan (1983)
Cosy Dens (1999)
Divided We Fall (2000)
Victims and Murderers (2000)
Román pro ženy (2005)
Men in Hope (2011)

Television
Youngest of the Hamr's Family (1975)
Arabela (1979)
Přítelkyně z domu smutku (1992)
Místo nahoře (2004)
Sebemilenec (TV film, 2013)

Awards and nominations

References

External links

1955 births
Living people
Actresses from Prague
Academy of Performing Arts in Prague alumni
Czech film actresses
Czech television actresses
Czech stage actresses
20th-century Czech actresses
21st-century Czech actresses
Recipients of the Thalia Award